Langelurillus primus is a jumping spider species in the genus Langelurillus that lives in Kenya. It was first described in 1994 by Maciej Próchniewicz. It is the type species for the genus, the species name denoting its position as first to be described, based on samples found in 1975.

References

Fauna of Kenya
Salticidae
Spiders described in 1994
Spiders of Africa